Hertel is a German surname. Notable people with the name include: 

 Aage Hertel (1873–1944), Danish actor
 Curtis Hertel (1953–2016), U.S. politician from Michigan
 Curtis Hertel Jr. (born 1978), U.S. politician from Michigan
 Dennis M. Hertel (born 1948), U.S. Representative from Michigan
 Jean-Baptiste Hertel de Rouville (1668–1722), seigneur and military officer of New France
 Jean-Baptiste-René Hertel de Rouville (1789–1859), seigneur of New France, son of Jean-Baptiste-Melchior
 Jean-Baptiste-Melchior Hertel de Rouville (1748–1817), seigneur of New France, grandson of Jean-Baptiste
 Johann Christian Hertel (1697–1754), German musician
 Johann Wilhelm Hertel (1727–1789), German musician
 Johannes Hertel (1872–1955), Indologist
 John C. Hertel, U.S. politician from Michigan
 Kevin Hertel, U.S. politician from Michigan
 Hannes Hertel (1939–), German botanist and taxonomist
 Heinrich Hertel (1902–1982), German engineer
 Paul Hertel (born 1953), Austrian composer
 Peter Ludwig Hertel (1817–1899), German ballet music composer
 Stefanie Hertel (born 1979), German singer

Surnames from given names
Danish-language surnames
German-language surnames